Annie Brenon, known as Anne Brenon (born 14 November 1945) is a French writer and historian, specialising in Catharism. She is the founder of Heresis, a review on Catharism and other medieval heresies and from 1982 to 1998 was director of the Centre national d'études cathares René-Nelli in Carcassonne.

Life
Born in Mâcon, she gained a diploma as an "archiviste paléographe" at the École nationale des chartes with a thesis entitled "Les livres des Vaudois". She also received a diploma in religious sciences at the École pratique des hautes études and teaches medieval history at Montpellier University. She is a member of the Société des historiens médiévistes and an officer of the Palmes académiques.

Works 
She is the author of several works on Catharism, both non-fiction and novels.

 Le Vrai Visage du catharisme, Nouvelles Éditions Loubatières, 1990 - prix Notre Histoire
 Le Petit Livre aventureux des prénoms occitans au temps du catharisme, Loubatières, 1992
 Montségur (1244-1994) : mémoire d'hérétique, Loubatières, 1994
 Le Christianisme des bons hommes : message des cathares pour aujourd’hui, Éditions Le Foyer de l'âme, 1995  (with Pierre-Jean Ruff)
 Petit précis de catharisme, Éd. Loubatières, 1996
 Les Cathares : Pauvres du Christ ou apôtres de Satan ?, Éditions Gallimard, coll. « Découvertes Gallimard / Religions » (no. 319), 1997 ; 2000
 Les Archipels cathares : dissidence chrétienne dans l’Europe médiévale, Cahors, Dire Édition, 1997. Réédité en 2003 par l’Hydre Éditions
 Les Cathares : une Église chrétienne au bûcher, Toulouse, Éditions Milan, coll. « Les Essentiels », 1998
 La Croisade albigeoise, Toulouse, Le Pérégrinateur, 1998.
 Jordane, petite fille cathare de Fanjeaux, Toulouse, Loubatières, 1999 (roman jeunesse)
 Le Dico des Cathares, Milan, coll. « les dicos essentiels Milan », 2000
 L'Impénitente, L'hiver du catharisme, T. 1, L'Hydre, 2001 (roman)
 Joan, petit berger de Montaillou, MSM, 2002 (roman jeunesse)
 Les Fils du malheur, L'hiver du catharisme, T. 2, L'Hydre, 2002 (roman)
 Les Femmes cathares, Éditions Perrin, coll. « Tempus », 2005
 Pèire Autier (1245-1310), le dernier des cathares, Éd. Perrin, 2006
 Le Choix hérétique, La Louve Éditions, 2006
 Les Cathares, Éditions Albin Michel, coll. « Spiritualités vivantes », 2007
 Cathares : la contre-enquête (with Jean-Philippe de Tonnac), Albin Michel, 2008
 Les Mots du catharisme, 2010
 Petite histoire des cathares, 2018

References 

20th-century French historians
21st-century French historians
Historians of Catharism
French women novelists
French historical novelists
20th-century French novelists
21st-century French novelists
People from Mâcon
1945 births
Living people
École pratique des hautes études alumni
Officiers of the Ordre des Palmes Académiques
Academic staff of the University of Montpellier
20th-century French women
21st-century French women